The Darfur war crimes court or Special Court for Darfur is a planned court to be created in Sudan for trying suspects of war crimes and crimes against humanity carried out during the War in Darfur.

Plans for creating the court
On 21 January 2020, in the Darfur track of the 2019–2020 component of Sudanese peace process negotiations, the Sudan Revolutionary Front (SRF) and Sovereignty Council representatives agreed on the creation of a special court for trying suspects of war crimes and crimes against humanity carried out during the War in Darfur. The SRF and the Sovereignty Council agreed to create a commission that would establish the court.

References

War crimes organizations